"Just When I Needed You Most" is the title of a 1979 hit single by the American singer-songwriter Randy VanWarmer.

Background
VanWarmer was inspired to write "Just When I Needed You Most" by two events: his old car, that he loved and used for years, broke down on his way to work in Denver, Colorado, and he experienced a "devastating" breakup with a girlfriend. He wrote the song six months after that breakup, co-writing it with Tony Wilson of the group Hot Chocolate two years before it became a hit. After recording "Just When I Needed You Most" for an album recorded for the UK division of Bearsville Records, VanWarmer then flew to the US to pressure Bearsville's head office to promote the album which was duly remixed and released with "Just When I Needed You Most" as lead single although VanWarmer would recall that Bearsville evinced little enthusiasm for the track: "Nobody thought my version was an especially good version of the song [which] a few other people were thinking of cutting...Everybody just assumed mine was a demo for people to listen to who'd [then] cut the definitive version". It has also been asserted that "Your Light" the flip was the original intended A-side of VanWarmer's single.

Released as a single in February 1979, VanWarmer's "Just When I Needed You Most" spent two weeks atop the US Billboard adult contemporary chart in May of that year and in June 1979 reached its peak position of No. 4 on the Billboard Hot 100 chart, accruing an overall Top 40 tenure of 14 weeks and earning RIAA Gold record status. In addition, the track reached No. 71 on the Billboard country music chart. and in September 1979 made the Top 10 on the UK Singles Chart, peaking at No. 8. VanWarmer attributed his single's success to empathy for its heartbreak scenario: "It's happened to everyone. That emotion is universal...I always hoped the record wasn't wallowing in self-pity and it had some redeeming value, and I guess it does." VanWarmer also attributed his single's success to the autoharp instrumental break between the second and third verses, performed by John Sebastian.

Chart performance

Weekly charts

Year-end charts

Cover versions
The song's co-writer Tony Wilson recorded "Just When I Needed You Most" for his 1979 album Catch One.
Dolly Parton recorded a cover version of the song for her 1996 album, Treasures: this version, which like the VanWarmer original featured John Sebastian on autoharp, reached No. 62 on the Billboard country music chart. Other artists who either recorded or performed the song in concert include country music singers Tim McGraw, Donna Fargo, Skeeter Davis, Rhonda Vincent and Conway Twitty, R&B vocalist Millie Jackson, the German disco musician Peter Griffin, British glam rock band Smokie, reggae artists Barbara Jones, and Eddie Lovette, Filipino singer Pops Fernandez, Bob Dylan, Paul Butterfield, Billy Joe Royal, and the Spanish group Mocedades. In 2002, the American-Taiwanese singer Will Pan released a bilingual English/Chinese version of the song. Dana Winner recorded "Just When I Needed You Most" for her 2011 album Unforgettable. Anne Nolan recorded "Just When I Needed You Most" for her 2013 debut solo album Just One Voice.

In 1978, before it was a hit, "Just When I Needed You Most" was recorded by Ian Hunter, Mick Ronson, Corky Laing, and Felix Pappalardi.  This version of the song was not released until 1999 when it was included on the "Secret Sessions" CD.

A Finnish rendering of "Just When I Needed You Most" entitled "Juuri Kun Tarvitsin Sua" was recorded by ELF (fi) for their 1979 album Tarantella-Joe. Ingela "Pling" Forsman wrote lyrics in Swedish as När jag behövde dig mest, which was recorded by Swedish dansband Wizex on the 1980 album You Treated Me Wrong. A Spanish rendering entitled "Necesitando Tu Amor" was recorded by Mocedades for their 1982 album Amor De Hombre. An Austrian rendering entitled "Ausg´lacht" was recorded by Wolfgang Ambros for his 2012 album 190352. Francine Jordi sang the song 2013 in Switzerdeutsch dialect as "Wo di am meischte ha brucht".

See also
List of number-one adult contemporary singles of 1979 (U.S.)
List of 1970s one-hit wonders in the United States

References

External links
Single release info from discogs.com
 

1979 songs
1979 singles
Bearsville Records singles
Randy VanWarmer songs
Dolly Parton songs
Songs written by Randy VanWarmer
Pop ballads
Torch songs
Music videos directed by John Lloyd Miller
Wizex songs
Rock ballads
1970s ballads